The Six-Trak was an analogue synthesizer manufactured by Sequential Circuits in San Jose, California and released in January 1984. It is notable for being one of the first multi-timbral synthesizers, equipped with MIDI and an on-board six-track digital sequencer, hence the name. It was designed as an inexpensive and easily portable 'scratch-pad' machine for trying out arrangements. You can latch the arpeggiator and play along with sequences in real time. Also available is a unison mode which renders the keyboard monophonic but allows for very rich sounding timbres.

The Six-Trak is prominently featured and can be heard on the 1998 minimalist space music CD release The Dream Garden, by musician/composer Dane Rochelle. More recently it has been used by composer Christopher de Groot for the 2012 soundtrack to Australian feature film "Sororal".   

The Six-Trak's more famous sibling is the Prophet 5, widely used in much of the 1970s progressive rock. A number of other synthesizers made by Sequential Circuits used similar electronics, including the Multi-Trak, Max, and Split-8. 
the important parts on board of them was CEM3394 (a complete monophonic analog synth chip manufactured by Curtis Electromusic Specialties ). The Six-Trak used 6 chips for 6 voices of different timbre program.

Notable Users
 Marco Corbelli (Atrax Morgue)
 Gui Boratto
 Cirrus
 Helios Creed
 Überzone
 Guerilla Toss
 Solitaire (musician)
 Ruki Vverh!
 Chromeo
 Chris Tabron / The Ten Paces
 Luis Delgado
 Mitch Margo
 Thus Owls
 Luciano Mello
 Benny Blanco
Sequential Circuits synthesizers
Analog synthesizers
Polyphonic synthesizers